Capronnieria is a monotypic butterfly genus of the subfamily Satyrinae found in the Neotropical realm. Its one species is Capronnieria galesus described by Jean Baptiste Godart in 1824.

References

Euptychiina
Butterfly genera
Taxa named by Walter Forster (entomologist)